Jupiter is a given name of Latin origin which is given in reference either to the Roman god Jupiter or to the planet named after the mythological deity.

The name is traditionally masculine but has also been used for girls in recent years. For instance, there were 129 newborn girls who were named Jupiter in the United States in 2021 and 77 boys named Jupiter in the United States in the same year. Its use for girls has been attributed to its similarity in sound to the name Juniper, which has increased in popularity for American girls, or to its recent use by celebrities for their daughters. The name has also been used for female characters such as Sailor Jupiter in the Japanese manga series Sailor Moon and the 2015 science fiction film Jupiter Ascending. Names from mythology have also increased in popularity for both boys and girls in the United States.

References